Thomas J. D'Andrea (May 15, 1909 – May 14, 1998) was an American actor in films and on television.

Early years 
D'Andrea was born May 15, 1909, in Chicago, Illinois. He graduated from high school with honors and excelled in basketball.

Career 
D'Andrea's first job was at the Chicago Public Library, after which he worked in publicity at the Sherman Hotel in Chicago. Contacts with entertainers at the hotel led to an opportunity to work in Hollywood. After moving there in 1934, he became a publicist for Betty Grable, Gene Autry, Mae Clarke and Jackie Coogan.

He began writing scripts in 1937, creating lines for Ben Bernie, Jack Benny, Eddie Cantor and Olsen and Johnson and continued in television, writing for Cantor and Donald O'Connor on their shows.

In 1941, D'Andrea was drafted into the Army Air Corps. He was assigned to write a Gracie Fields program after being stationed at Camp Roberts, California..Reading lines at a rehearsal, Fields decided to have him read the lines in the show. He was assigned to the Overseas Radio Unit in 1943, and he began performing comedy in addition to writing.

While at Ciro's Restaurant on Sunset Strip attracted a Warner Bros.' executive's attention, resulting in a role in This is the Army, with Ronald Reagan. In 1946, the studio signed him to a long-term contract.

He went on to roles in Pride of the Marines with John Garfield, Night and Day with Cary Grant, Never Say Goodbye, Silver River with Errol Flynn, and Dark Passage with Humphrey Bogart. His last film was A House Is Not a Home with Shelley Winters in 1964.

After working in the film Kill the Umpire, with William Bendix in 1950, D'Andrea was chosen to play the part of Gillis, Riley's talkative neighbor in the long running television series, The Life of Riley starring Bendix. Other TV shows he appeared in were "Death Valley Days" with Ronald Reagan, "Playhouse 90" and the "Hallmark Hall of Fame."

On television, D'Andrea portrayed Biff, the bartender, in Dante and acted as himself in The Soldiers.

He appeared in the films This Is the Army, Pride of the Marines, Night and Day, Two Guys from Milwaukee, Never Say Goodbye, Humoresque, Love and Learn, Dark Passage, To the Victor, Silver River, Smart Girls Don't Talk, Fighter Squadron, Flaxy Martin, Tension, Kill the Umpire, The Next Voice You Hear..., Little Egypt and A House Is Not a Home. He appeared in the television series' The Soldiers, The Life of Riley, The Bill Dana Show, My Living Doll, The Farmer's Daughter, The Double Life of Henry Phyfe, The Beverly Hillbillies, The Andy Griffith Show, ‘’The Dick Van Dyke Show’’, Green Acres and That Girl, among others.

Personal life 
D'Andrea's first marriage ended in divorce. He next married model Helen Pender. He was a Catholic and a member of both the Friar’s Club and Screen Actors Guild.

Death 
D'Andrea died the day before his 89th birthday on May 14, 1998, in Port Charlotte, Florida, at South Port Square.

Filmography

References

External links
 

1909 births
1998 deaths
20th-century American male actors
American male film actors
American male television actors
Male actors from Chicago
Male Western (genre) film actors
American Roman Catholics